is a Japanese footballer currently playing as a defender for Fagiano Okayama.

Career statistics

Club
.

Notes

References

1999 births
Living people
Association football people from Nagasaki Prefecture
Kwansei Gakuin University alumni
Japanese footballers
Association football defenders
J2 League players
Vissel Kobe players
Fagiano Okayama players